Samarendra Chandra Deb was a Bengali Indian jurist, who had served as Chief Justice of the Calcutta High Court after the retirement of Justice Sambhu Chandra Ghose. He was educated at the Scottish Church College, and at the University of Calcutta. He served as a Chief Justice of the Calcutta High Court in 1983 for the period of a year.

References

20th-century Indian judges
Chief Justices of the Calcutta High Court
Scottish Church College alumni
University of Calcutta alumni
20th-century Bengalis